Twin Lakes is an unincorporated community in Lowndes County, in the U.S. state of Georgia.

History
Twin Lakes was founded in 1825, and named for two natural lakes beside the town site.

References

Unincorporated communities in Georgia (U.S. state)
Unincorporated communities in Lowndes County, Georgia